Schinia varix is a species of moth belonging to the family Noctuidae. It is found in eastern Texas, central Oklahoma and Louisiana.

Description
In the male the forewings are yellow with dark purple bands in the basal and subterminal areas and the hindwings are generally black with yellow fringes. The female is similar but with generally darker forewings. This species flies at night from August to early October.

Ecology
The breeding biology of this species is unknown and larvae have never been found but its habitat and distribution suggest the larval food plant is probably some species of Gaillardia.

History
It was first collected in 1944 in eastern Texas where it was feeding on various pines since it inhabited mostly pine forests. The later discoveries were made in Louisiana where it fed on gallberry and Oklahoma where the main food was oak and hickory. However, it wasn't described till 2003.

References

External links
Schinia varix on Bug Guide

Further reading

varix
Moths described in 2003
Endemic fauna of the United States
Moths of North America